Songbidhan Padak (Bengali: সংবিধান পদক), is a military medal of Bangladesh. The medal was established in honor of the adoption of  the constitution on November 4, 1972.This is a medal of the constitution.Commemorating the proclamation of the Bangladeshi constitution

References 

Military awards and decorations of Bangladesh